is a city located in Gunma Prefecture, Japan. , the city had an estimated population of 47,911 in 24,749 households, and a population density of 210 persons per km².

Geography
Annaka is located in the southwestern portion of Gunma Prefecture at the very northernmost point of the Kantō Plain, bordered by Nagano Prefecture to the west. The Usui Pass connects Annaka with neighboring Karuizawa, Nagano.

Mountains:  Chausuyama (596m), Mount Myōgi (1103m) 
Rivers: Usigawa, Tsukumogawa
Lakes: Sakamoto Dam, Nakagi Dam

Surrounding municipalities
Gunma Prefecture
 Takasaki
 Tomioka
 Shimonita
Nagano Prefecture
 Karuizawa

Climate
Annaka has a Humid continental climate (Köppen Cfa) characterized by warm summers and cold winters with heavy snowfall.  The average annual temperature in Annaka is 13.9 °C. The average annual rainfall is 1227 mm with September as the wettest month. The temperatures are highest on average in August, at around 26.3 °C, and lowest in January, at around 2.5 °C.

Demographics
Per Japanese census data, the population of Annaka has recently declined after decades of relative stability.

History
Annaka is located within traditional Kōzuke Province. During the Edo period, central Annaka was the jōkamachi of Annaka Domain, a feudal domain held by the Itakura clan under the Tokugawa shogunate. The area also prospered from its location on the Nakasendō highway connecting Edo with Kyoto. Post stations located within the borders of modern Annaka were: Itahana-shuku, Annaka-shuku, Matsuida-shuku and Sakamoto-shuku.

Annaka Town was created within Usui District, Gunma Prefecture on April 1, 1889, with the creation of the modern municipalities system after the Meiji Restoration. On March 1, 1955, Annaka merged with neighboring Haraichi, Isobe, and Itahana towns, and Higashiyokono, Iwanoya, Akima, and Gokan villages. It was raised to city status on November 1, 1958. On March 18, 2006, the town of Matsuida, merged with Annaka. Usui District was dissolved as a result of this merger.

Government
Annaka has a mayor-council form of government with a directly elected mayor and a unicameral city council of 20 members. Annaka contributes two members to the Gunma Prefectural Assembly. In terms of national politics, the city is part of Gunma 5th district of the lower house of the Diet of Japan.

Economy

Annaka is a regional commercial center and transportation hub. Toho Zinc operates a large plant in the city, as does Shin-Etsu Chemical.

Education
Annaka has 12 public elementary schools and five public middle schools operated by the city government, and two public high schools operated by the Gunma Prefectural Board of Education. There is also one private combined middle/high school.

Transportation

Railway
 JR East – Hokuriku Shinkansen
  
 JR East – Shin'etsu Main Line
  -  -  -  -

Highway
  – Masuida-Myogi IC,  Usui-Karuizawa IC, Yokogawa SA

Local attractions

Ruins of Matsuida Castle
Yanase Futagozuka Kofun, a National Historic Site
Isobe Onsen
Kirizumi Onsen
Asazuma Art Museum
Myogi Sanroku Art Museum
Usui Pass
Usui Pass Railway Heritage Park

Sister-city relations
 Kimberley, British Columbia, Canada, friendship city since December 16, 2005

References

External links

Official Website 

Cities in Gunma Prefecture
Annaka, Gunma